Whatever Will Be, Will Be is a 1997 Hong Kong erotic drama film directed by Barry Chu and starring Michael Tse and Teresa Mak. The film was rated Category III by the Hong Kong motion picture rating system.

Cast
Michael Tse
Teresa Mak
Danny Summer
Stephen Ho
Lanna Wong
Joanna Chan
Cheung Hung-on
Law San-wing
H Yuen-ngai
Lam Wai-ling
Hui Sze-man

External links
 Page describing the film
 

1997 films
1990s erotic drama films
Hong Kong erotic films
1990s Cantonese-language films
Golden Harvest films
Films set in Hong Kong
Films shot in Hong Kong
1997 drama films
1990s Hong Kong films